Southside Spinners is a Dutch musical partnership between Marco Verkuylen (aka Marco V), Benjamin Kuyten (aka Benjamin Bates), Jesse and Thomas Hagenbeek.

Their single "Luvstruck", released in 1998 in the Netherlands, initially reached number 85 in the UK Singles Chart in July 1999. It gained extra prominence a year later when used in the soundtrack of the film Kevin & Perry Go Large, and on re-release in May 2000 peaked at number 9 in the UK chart.

Dutch musical groups